Elijah Anderson (born 1943 in Hermondale, Missouri) is an American sociologist. He is the Sterling Professor of Sociology and of African American Studies at Yale University, where he teaches and directs the Urban Ethnography Project. Anderson is one of the nation’s leading urban ethnographers and cultural theorists. Anderson is known most notably for his book, Code of the Street: Decency, Violence, and the Moral Life of the Inner City (1999).

Early life
Anderson received his B.A. from Indiana University Bloomington, his M.A. from the University of Chicago and his Ph.D. from Northwestern University, where he was mentored by Howard S. Becker.

Career
Anderson worked as an assistant professor of Sociology at Swarthmore College (1973–1975). In 1975, he joined the University of Pennsylvania faculty where he rose to associate professor in 1981, and to full professor in 1988. He was appointed to the Max and Heidi Berry Term Chair in the Social Sciences in 1989, to the Charles and William L. Day Professorship in 1991, and then to Distinguished Professor in 2001. Anderson served for many years as the Charles and William L. Day Distinguished Professor of the Social Sciences and Professor of Sociology at the University of Pennsylvania, with a secondary appointment in the Wharton School; in 2008, he was awarded the Charles and William L. Day Distinguished Professor Emeritus of the Social Sciences at the University of Pennsylvania. He has also served as Visiting Professor at Swarthmore College, Princeton University, and Ecole des Etudes Hautes en Science Sociales in Paris, France.

Anderson has written and edited numerous books, book chapters, articles, and scholarly reports on race in American cities. His most prominent works include Code of the Street: Decency, Violence, and the Moral Life of the Inner City (1999), winner of the 2000 Komarovsky Award from the Eastern Sociological Society, Streetwise: Race, Class, and Change in an Urban Community (1990), winner of the American Sociological Association’s Robert E. Park Award for the best published book in the area of Urban Sociology, and the classic sociological work, A Place on the Corner: A Study of Black Street Corner Men. In 2008, he edited Against the Wall: Poor, Young, Black, and Male], which is based on a national conference, "Poor, Young, Black, and Male: A Case for National Action?" which he organized at the University of Pennsylvania in 2006. His most recent work is The Cosmopolitan Canopy: Race and Civility in Everyday Life.

In addition, Anderson has won the Lindback Award for Distinguished Teaching at the University of Pennsylvania, and he was named the Robin M. Williams, Jr., Distinguished Lecturer for 1999-2000 by the Eastern Sociological Society. In 2006, he was awarded an honorary Doctor of Science degree from Northwestern University. Anderson has served on the board of directors of the American Academy of Political and Social Science and as vice-president of the American Sociological Association. He has served in an editorial capacity for a wide range of professional journals and special publications in his field, including Qualitative Sociology,  Ethnography, American Journal of Sociology, American Sociological Review, City & Community, Annals of the Society of Political and Social Science, and the International Journal of Urban and Regional Research.  He has also served as a consultant to a variety of government agencies, including the White House, the United States Congress, the National Academy of Sciences, and the National Science Foundation. Additionally, he was a member of the National Research Council’s Panel on the Understanding and Control of Violent Behavior.

Confederate statues
In August 2017, in the wake of the Unite the Right rally in Charlottesville, Virginia, Anderson argued that Confederate monuments "really impact the psyche of black people."

Selected publications
The Cosmopolitan Canopy: Race and Civility in Everyday Life" (2011, W.W. Norton)Against the Wall: Poor, Black, and Male (editor, 2008) A Place on the Corner: A Study of Black Street Corner Men (2nd ed., 2003)Problem of the Century: Racial Stratification in the United States (co-editor with D. Massey, 2001)Code of the street: Decency, violence, and the moral life of the inner city. New York: W.W. Norton, 1999, pp. 150-154, .Streetwise: Race, Class and Change in an Urban Community (1990)
 Being Here and Being There: Fieldwork Encounters and Ethnographic Discoveries.  From series The Annals of the American Academy of Political and Social Science, 595 (September) (co-editor with Scott N. Brooks, Raymond Gunn, and Nikki Jones, 2004)  The Study of African American Problems: W.E.B. Du Bois's Agenda, Then and Now.  From series The Annals of the American Academy of Political and Social Science'', 568 (March) (co-editor with Tukufu Zuberi, 2000).

References

External links
Yale University, Department of Sociology Faculty Page
Yale University, Office of Public Affairs and Communication
 https://web.archive.org/web/20160211133445/http://elijahanderson.com/Home.html
 Distinguished Sociologist Elijah Anderson Joins Yale Faculty
 Sociology Faculty: Elijah Anderson
 A review of Elijah Anderson, "The Code of the Street," The Wagner Review, Spring 1999.

Living people
Indiana University Bloomington alumni
University of Chicago alumni
Northwestern University alumni
Yale University faculty
Yale Sterling Professors
University of Pennsylvania faculty
American sociologists
1943 births
Winners of the Stockholm Prize in Criminology